Thomas Nicolson or Nicholson may refer to:

 Thomas Nicolson of Carnock (died 1646), commissioner for Stirlingshire
 Sir Thomas Nicolson, 6th Baronet (died 1693), of the Nicolson baronets
 Thomas Nicolson (bishop) (1645–1718), Roman Catholic bishop
 Thomas Nicolson, 4th Lord Napier (1669–1688), Scottish peer
 Sir Thomas Nicolson, 1st Baronet (died 1728), of the Nicolson baronets
 Thomas Nicholson (architect) (1823–1895), British architect
 Thomas Nicholson (cricketer) (1876–1939), English cricketer
 Tom Nicolson (1879–1951), British track and field athlete
 Thomas Nicholson (educator), American health educator and drug policy specialist

See also

 Nickolson Thomas (born 1982), Trinidadian footballer